The province of Sindh is situated in a subtropical region; it is hot in the summer and cold in winter. Temperatures frequently rise above  between May and August, and the minimum average temperature of  occurs during December and January. The southwesterly monsoon wind begins to blow in mid-February and continues until the end of September, whereas the cool northerly wind blows during the winter months from October to January.

Sindh lies between the two monsoons — the southwest monsoon from the Indian Ocean and the northeast or retreating monsoon, deflected towards it by the Himalayan mountains — and escapes the influence of both. The region's scarcity of rainfall is compensated by the inundation of the Indus twice a year, caused by the spring and summer melting of Himalayan snow and by rainfall in the monsoon season. These natural patterns have recently changed somewhat with the construction of dams and barrages on the Indus River. In 2005, Hyderabad received  in just 11 hours. In Padidan a record rainfall of 1,722 millimeters was recorded in the monsoon season of 2022 which was also part of the massive 2022 Pakistan floods and appears on the List of extreme weather records in Pakistan.

 

Sindh is divided into three climatic regions: Siro (the upper region, centred on Jacobabad), Wicholo (the middle region, centred on Hyderabad), and Lar (the lower region, centred on Karachi).

The thermal equator passes through upper Sindh, where the air is generally very dry. It was not only the hottest temperature ever recorded in Pakistan but also the hottest reliably measured temperature ever recorded in the continent of Asia and the fourth highest temperature ever recorded on earth. The previous record for Sindh and Pakistan, and for all of Asia, had been , reached on 12 June 1919.

In the winters, frost is common. Central Sindh's temperatures are generally lower than those of upper Sindh but higher than those of lower Sindh. Dry hot days and cool nights are typical during the summer. Central Sindh's maximum temperature typically reaches . Lower Sindh has a damper and humid maritime climate affected by the southwestern winds in summer and northeastern winds in winter, with lower rainfall than Central Sindh. In Gorakh temperatures in winter nights can sour down to -15.

The highest temperatures each year in Pakistan, typically rising to above , are usually recorded in Shaheed Benazeerabad District (previously called Nawabshah District) and Sibbi from May to August.

Awareness Against Climate Change by Sindhis

Lahooti Melo
Every year, Lahot and his team bring forth the Lahooti Melo in Sindh. In every year, Lahooti Team arranges various themes. A climate change awareness theme was organized by Lahooti Melo in 2020. Different sessions and panel discussions were held on the stage according to the theme.Lahooti Melo 5 gearing up to talk about climate changeLahooti Melo 2020 to talk about climate change

Sindh Literature Festival
Sindh Literature Festival is first and largest literary festival organised by Naseer Gopang and Zohaib Kaka. The SLF event is a celebration of the potency of language, cultural diversity, music, and the values of harmony and acceptance. Its goal is to showcase the dynamic and lively cultures and customs of Sindh, which present an array of experiences unique to the region. Moreover, the event seeks to create a platform where both established and budding writers can interact with their followers and attract new admirers. Over the course of three days, the event is dedicated to commemorating the literary and cultural heritage of the province.

In 2023, Sindh Literature Festival team has announced its theme regarding Climate Change under the name of "Aalam Sabh Aabad Kareen". That name is captured from Shah Abdul Latif Bhittai Poetry.

See also

 Climate of Karachi
 Sindh Literature Festival
 Climate of Pakistan
 Climate of Hyderabad
Climate of Nawabshah
 List of extreme weather records in Pakistan

References

External links
 Pakistan Meteorological Department
 Regional Met Center for Sindh

 
Environment of Sindh